Deborah L. Benzil is an American neurosurgeon specializing in brain and spine tumors, stereotactic radiosurgery, socioeconomic education. She was awarded the  Anthony Greto Fellowship from the Association of Brain Tumor Research. She is the Vice Chair and professor of neurosurgery at the Cleveland Clinic in Cleveland, Ohio, USA.

She has previously served as the Vice President of the American Association of Neurological Surgeons, one of the largest neurosurgical societies in the United States, past chair of the Council of State Neurosurgical Societies, and the founder of Women in Neurosurgery.

Early life and education 

Deborah L. Benzil was raised rural Maryland. She attended Brown University as an undergraduate, receiving her degree with honors in 1981. She graduated from the University of Maryland School of Medicine in 1985, then moved on to the U.S. National Institutes of Health for a fellowship in surgical neurology from 1985–1987. From 1988–1994, Benzil was a neurosurgery resident at Brown University and Rhode Island Hospital, where she was granted the Association of Brain Tumor Research's Anthony Greto Fellowship for her research on brain tumors.

Career and research 

In 1994, Benzil joined the faculty of New York Medical College as an assistant professor. In 2018, she moved to the Cleveland Clinic as Vice Chair of the department of neurosurgery.

Publications

Awards and honors 

Phi Beta Kappa 

New York Magazine, top Doctors

Castle Connolly Top Doctors, Westchester

Castle Connolly Top Doctors, Hudson Valley

Plantree Physician Award, Northern Westchester Hospital

Hats Off Award, Westchester Medical Center

Personal life 
Benzil's and her husband – also a molecular biologist – have two children.

References

External links 

PubMed search for Deborah Benzil

Year of birth missing (living people)
Living people
American women neuroscientists
Women surgeons
Physicians from Maryland
American neurosurgeons
University of Maryland School of Medicine alumni
21st-century American women physicians
21st-century American physicians
Brown University alumni
20th-century American women physicians
20th-century American physicians
21st-century surgeons
20th-century surgeons
Cleveland Clinic people